Shunji (written: 俊二, 俊治, 俊嗣, 舜二 or 隼士) is a masculine Japanese given name. Notable people with the name include

, Japanese photographer
, Japanese manga artist
, Japanese actor
, Japanese actor
, Imperial Japanese Navy admiral
, Japanese film director, video artist, writer and documentarian
, Japanese hurdler and sprinter
Shunji Kasuya (born 1962), Japanese racing driver
, Japanese footballer and manager
, Japanese politician
, Japanese professional wrestler
, Japanese photographer
, Japanese general and physician
, Japanese subtitler and translator
, Japanese professional wrestler
Shunji Watanabe (born 1938), founder of Shorinjiryu Kenyukai Watanabe
, Japanese motorcycle racer

Fictional characters
Kimura Shunji, a character in the South Korean television series Bridal Mask

Japanese masculine given names